Washington County is a county in the U.S. state of Idaho. As of the 2010 census, the population was 10,198. The county seat and largest city is Weiser, with over half of the county's population. The county was established in 1879 when Idaho was a territory and named after U.S. President George Washington.

Geography

Adjacent counties
 Adams County - north
 Gem County - east
 Payette County - south
 Malheur County, Oregon - southwest
 Baker County, Oregon - west

Major highways
 US 95

National protected areas
 Boise National Forest (part)
 Deer Flat National Wildlife Refuge (part)
 Payette National Forest (part)

Rivers
 Snake River
 Weiser River

Reservoirs
 Brownlee
 Crane Creek
 Mann Creek
 Paddock Valley

Demographics

2000 census
As of the census of 2000, there were 9,977 people, 3,762 households, and 2,738 families living in the county.  The population density was 7 people per square mile (3/km2).  There were 4,138 housing units at an average density of 3 per square mile (1/km2).  The racial makeup of the county was 87.61% White, 1.03% Asian, 0.66% Native American, 0.10% Black or African American,  0.07% Pacific Islander, 8.17% from other races, and 2.36% from two or more races.  13.75% of the population were Hispanic or Latino of any race. 15.7% were of German, 14.3% English, 10.1% American and 7.7% Irish ancestry.

There were 3,762 households, out of which 32.7% had children under the age of 18 living with them, 60.7% were married couples living together, 8.2% had a female householder with no husband present, and 27.2% were non-families. 23.5% of all households were made up of individuals, and 13.30% had someone living alone who was 65 years of age or older.  The average household size was 2.61 and the average family size was 3.10.

In the county, the population was spread out, with 27.4% under the age of 18, 7.20% from 18 to 24, 23.4% from 25 to 44, 24.3% from 45 to 64, and 17.70% who were 65 years of age or older.  The median age was 39 years. For every 100 females there were 95.80 males.  For every 100 females age 18 and over, there were 93.0 males.

The median income for a household in the county was $30,625, and the median income for a family was $35,542. Males had a median income of $27,222 versus $18,053 for females. The per capita income for the county was $15,464.  About 10.00% of families and 13.30% of the population were below the poverty line, including 16.60% of those under age 18 and 9.90% of those age 65 or over.

2010 census
As of the 2010 United States Census, there were 10,198 people, 4,034 households, and 2,803 families living in the county. The racial makeup of the county was 86.6% white, 1.0% American Indian, 0.9% Asian, 0.2% black or African American, 9.1% from other races, and 2.2% from two or more races. Those of Hispanic or Latino origin made up 16.8% of the population. In terms of ancestry, 20.0% were English, 18.2% were German, 14.8% were Irish, and 9.6% were American.

Of the 4,034 households, 30.4% had children under the age of 18 living with them, 54.9% were married couples living together, 9.7% had a female householder with no husband present, 30.5% were non-families, and 25.8% of all households were made up of individuals. The average household size was 2.50 and the average family size was 2.99. The median age was 43.6 years.

The median income for a household in the county was $36,542 and the median income for a family was $46,970. Males had a median income of $36,765 versus $26,406 for females. The per capita income for the county was $20,015. About 10.9% of families and 13.2% of the population were below the poverty line, including 15.6% of those under age 18 and 9.6% of those age 65 or over.

2020 census
Note: the US Census treats Hispanic/Latino as an ethnic category. This table excludes Latinos from the racial categories and assigns them to a separate category. Hispanics/Latinos can be of any race.

As of the 2020 United States census, there were 10,500 people, 4,035 households, and 2,708 families residing in the county.

Education
The county is served by three school districts based in the county:

 Weiser District #431
Weiser High School
Weiser Middle School
Park Intermediate School
Pioneer Primary School.
 Cambridge Joint District #432
Cambridge Junior-Senior High School
Cambridge Elementary School
 Midvale District #433
Midvale Senior High School.
Midvale Junior High School
Midvale Elementary School

Additionally Payette Joint School District 371 includes a portion of Washington County.

Communities

Cities
Cambridge
Midvale
Weiser

Politics

See also
 National Register of Historic Places listings in Washington County, Idaho

References

External links
 
 County Parcel Map
 State of Idaho official site - Washington County

 

 
Idaho counties
1879 establishments in Idaho Territory
Populated places established in 1879